Alexei Bulatov (born January 24, 1978) is a Russian professional ice hockey forward. He currently plays for Avtomobilist Yekaterinburg in the Kontinental Hockey League. Bulatov was selected by the New York Rangers in the 9th round (254th overall) of the 1999 NHL Entry Draft.

References

External links

Living people
Severstal Cherepovets players
Salavat Yulaev Ufa players
HC CSK VVS Samara players
HC Spartak Moscow players
Metallurg Novokuznetsk players
Zauralie Kurgan players
Molot-Prikamye Perm players
Avtomobilist Yekaterinburg players
HC Yugra players
New York Rangers draft picks
1978 births
Russian ice hockey forwards